THe enzyme 6-methylsalicylate decarboxylase catalyzes the chemical reaction

6-methylsalicylate  3-cresol + CO2

This enzyme belongs to the family of lyases, specifically the carboxy-lyases, which cleave carbon-carbon bonds.  The systematic name of this enzyme class is 6-methylsalicylate carboxy-lyase (3-cresol-forming). Other names in common use include 6-methylsalicylic acid (2,6-cresotic acid) decarboxylase, 6-MSA decarboxylase, and 6-methylsalicylate carboxy-lyase.

References 

 
 

EC 4.1.1
Enzymes of unknown structure